Kim Jae-sik (born 17 May 1967) is a former professional tennis player from South Korea.

Biography
Kim made all of his ATP Tour main draw appearances at his home tournament, the Korea Open, featuring in every edition from 1990 to 1992.

During his career he played in a total of five Davis Cup ties for South Korea.

At the 1990 Asian Games he won a silver medal in the team event and a bronze medal in the singles.

He is the current captain of the South Korea Davis Cup team.

See also
List of South Korea Davis Cup team representatives

References

External links
 
 
 

1967 births
Living people
South Korean male tennis players
Tennis coaches
Medalists at the 1990 Asian Games
Tennis players at the 1990 Asian Games
Asian Games silver medalists for South Korea
Asian Games bronze medalists for South Korea
Asian Games medalists in tennis
Universiade medalists in tennis
Universiade bronze medalists for South Korea
Medalists at the 1987 Summer Universiade
20th-century South Korean people